Strelka Institute for Media, Architecture and Design is a non-profit international educational project, founded in 2009 and located in Moscow. Strelka incorporates an education programme on urbanism and urban development aimed at professionals with a higher education, a public summer programme, the Strelka Press publishing house, and KB Strelka, the consulting arm of the Institute. Strelka has been listed among the top-100 best architecture schools in 2014, according to Domus magazine.

The Institute has been directed since 2013 by Varvara Melnikova.

Education programme
The Institute aims to educate the next generation of architects, designers and media professionals, enabling them to shape the 21st century world. Each year, Strelka welcomes young professionals and gives them the opportunity to work together with experts in the fields of urbanism, architecture and communications from all over the world. During this nine-month post-graduate programme, the researchers explore the issues related to Russia's urban development through a multidisciplinary method conducted in English. Experimental methods, a holistic approach to architecture, media and design, and an emphasis on research are the main characteristics of the programme. The prominent architect and architecture theorist, Rem Koolhaas (AMO/OMA), contributed to the designing of the Institute's education programme.
  
Since 2010, Yuri Grigoryan, architect and head of the Meganom architectural bureau], has served as director of the education programme.

Since 2012, the curriculum has been designed by two programming directors: Anastassia Smirnova – partner in the Rotterdam-based architecture and research bureau SVESMI, and David Erixon – founder of the Hyper Island school, and member of the Megafon board of directors.

The theme, programme structure and list of lecturers are updated every year. The 2013/14 programme includes a three-month introductory course composed of discussions, lectures and seminars, an urban development contest, work in one of four research studios, and a final exhibition of student projects.

Since 2016, Benjamin H. Bratton, design theorist and author of The Stack: On Software and Sovereignty, is programme director. The program theme, The New Normal, focuses on long-term urban futures in relation to technological, geographic and ecological complexities.

Some notable faculty at the Strelka Institute has been : Keller Easterling, Benjamin H. Bratton, Winy Maas, Brendan McGetrick, Anastassia Smirnova, Felix Madrazo, METASITU (Eduardo Cassina and Liva Dudareva), Joseph Grima, Laura Baird, metahaven (Vinca Kruk and Daniel van der Velden), Reinier De Graaf, Carlo Ratti, and Rem Koolhaas.

KB Strelka
KB Strelka provides strategic consulting services in the fields of architecture and urban planning, as well as cultural and spatial programming. The company was founded in 2013 by the executive board of the Strelka Institute. KB’s method is based on the implementation of transparent competition procedures, involving international experts, forecasting of expenses, and risk analysis at the early stages of project realisation. In 2013, KB organised several key international competitions for Russia: Zaryadye Park, the National Centre for Contemporary Arts, the Museum and Educational Centre of the Polytechnic Museum and Lomonosov Moscow State University, and the International Financial Centre in Rublyovo-Arkhangelskoye. Despite transparency efforts, KB Strelka's urbanisation projects in different cities in Russia have received criticism for the costs and the methods employed; such as the violent clearing of small street kiosks, corruption or incompetent design.

Summer at Strelka
From the end of May until mid September, Strelka’s courtyard hosts a public programme that is open to all. Its programme includes: lectures by prominent architects, urbanists, designers, social activists and scholars; discussions on topical urban issues; workshops; film screenings; theatre performances; concerts and fairs.

Strelka Press
Strelka Press publishes books and essays on modern issues of architecture, design and urban development in both English and Russian. The publishing house releases both printed and digital books. Strelka Press is based in London and Moscow. Senior editors of the publishing programme – Justin McGuirk and Andrey Kurilkin. Strelka Press has published books by Rem Koolhaas, Boris Groys, William Mitchell, Donald Norman, Keller Easterling, Vladimir Paperny, and others.

Other information
 Strelka is curating the Russian pavilion for the XIV Venice Architectural Biennale. 
 Strelka took part in the renovation of Moscow’s Gorky Park, designed the concept for Big Moscow development project, and framed the programme for the Moscow Urban Forum 2012-2013.
 In 2013, Strelka launched What Moscow Wants, an on-line platform to crowdsource ideas for improving the development of Moscow.

Strelka Bar
Strelka Bar is located on the territory of the Institute. It has repeatedly been acknowledged as one of the best spots in Moscow according to Afisha magazine. All proceeds from the bar go towards supporting the Institute.

References

External links
Official website

Architecture schools in Russia
Art schools in Russia
Education in Moscow
Urban planning
Educational institutions established in 2009
2009 establishments in Russia